Mac OS X Panther (version 10.3) is the fourth major release of macOS, Apple's desktop and server operating system. It followed Mac OS X Jaguar and preceded Mac OS X Tiger. It was released on October 24, 2003, with the retail price of US$129 for a single user and US$199 for a five user, family license.

System requirements
Panther's system requirements are:
PowerPC G3, G4, or G5 processor (at least 233 MHz)
Built-in USB
At least 128 MB of RAM (256 MB recommended, minimum of 96 MB supported unofficially)
At least 1.5 GB of available hard disk space
CD drive
Internet access requires a compatible service provider; iDisk requires a .Mac account
Video conferencing requires:
333 MHz or faster PowerPC G3, G4, or G5 processor
Broadband internet access (100 kbit/s or faster)
Compatible FireWire DV camera or web camera

Since a New World ROM was required for Mac OS X Panther, certain older computers (such as beige Power Mac G3s and 'Wall Street' PowerBook G3s) were unable to run Panther by default. Third-party software (such as XPostFacto) can, however, override checks made during the install process; otherwise, installation or upgrades from Jaguar fails on these older machines.

Panther still fully supported the Classic environment for running older Mac OS 9 applications, but made Classic application windows double-buffered, interfering with some applications written to draw directly to screen.

New and changed features

End-user features
Apple advertised that Mac OS X Panther had over 150 new features, including:

Finder: Updated with a brushed-metal interface, a new live search engine, customizable Sidebar, secure deletion, colored labels (resurrected from classic Mac OS) in the filesystem and Zip support built in. The Finder icon was also changed.
Fast user switching: Allows a user to remain logged in while another user logs in, and quickly switch among several sessions.
Exposé: Helps the user manage windows by showing them all as thumbnails.
TextEdit: TextEdit now is also compatible with Microsoft Word (.doc) documents.
Xcode developer tools: Faster compile times with gcc 3.3.
Preview: Increased speed of PDF rendering.
QuickTime: Now supports the Pixlet high-definition video codec.

New applications in Panther
Font Book: A font manager which simplifies viewing character maps, and adding new fonts that can be used systemwide. The app also allows the user to organize fonts into collections.
FileVault: On-the-fly encryption and decryption of a user's home folder.
iChat AV: The new version of iChat. Now with built-in audio- and video conferencing.
X11: Compatibility for applications based on the X Window System, commonly used for UNIX applications, is available through an optional install, found in the install disk. Mac OS X Panther is the first macOS version to officially support X11. It utilizes Quartz to provide hardware accelerated graphics and is based on the XFree86 implementation of X Window System.
Safari: A new web browser that was developed to replace Internet Explorer for Mac when the contract between Apple and Microsoft ended, although Internet Explorer for Mac was still available. Safari 1.0 was included in an update in Jaguar but was used as the default browser in Panther.

Other
Microsoft Windows interoperability improvements, including out-of-the-box support for Active Directory and SecurID-based VPNs.
Built-in fax support, with Address Book integration. Sending a fax can be done using the native Print dialog. To receive faxes, users must pre-configure in System Preferences on how the system should handle an incoming fax, with options including selecting a folder to save the incoming faxes, to automatically email to an address or to print via a selected printer, upon receiving of the fax.
Secure Empty Trash, was a feature added in Mac OS X Panther to ensure files that are deleted and cannot be recovered, through the use of  data erasure techniques.

Release history

Timeline

References

3
PowerPC operating systems
2003 software
Computer-related introductions in 2003